A List of Czech films of the 2000s.

2000s
Films
Czech